Harlan Coben is an American writer of mystery novels and thrillers. The plots of his novels often involve the resurfacing of unresolved or misinterpreted events in the past, murders, or fatal accidents and have multiple twists. Among his novels are two series, each involving the same protagonist set in and around New York and New Jersey; some characters appear in both. 

Coben has won an Edgar Award, a Shamus Award, and an Anthony Award—the first author to receive all three. His books have been translated into 43 different languages and sold over 60 million copies.

Early life and education
Coben was born into a Jewish family in Newark, New Jersey, and was raised in Livingston, where he graduated from Livingston High School, with his childhood friend, future governor Chris Christie.

He studied political science at Amherst College, where he was a member of the Psi Upsilon fraternity, along with Dan Brown. Coben was in his senior year at college when he realized he wanted to write.

Career
After graduating in 1984, Coben worked in the travel industry, in a company owned by his grandfather. It was during that time when he wrote his first book, romantic suspense thriller Play Dead, which was accepted for publication when he was 26 and saw the light in 1990. It was followed by Miracle Cure in 1991. He then began writing a series of thrillers featuring a former basketball player turned sports agent, Myron Bolitar, who often finds himself investigating murders involving his clients.

Tell No One, his first stand-alone thriller since the creation of the Myron Bolitar series in 1995, was published in 2001. A French-language film adaptation based on the book was released in 2006. Coben followed Tell No One with nine more stand-alone novels. His novel Hold Tight, published on April 15, 2008, was his first book to debut at number 1 on the New York Times Best Seller list.

In 2003, Coben published a short story about his father, who had died of a heart attack at the age of 59 in 1988. Entitled "The Key to My Father," the story was published in The New York Times on Father's Day, June 15, 2003.  Besides The New York Times, his essays and columns have appeared in Parade Magazine and Bloomberg Views.

Bibliography

Awards
Coben won the 1996 Anthony Award in the category "Best Paperback Original", for Deal Breaker, the first volume of the Myron Bolitar series; it was also nominated for an Edgar Award in the same category. Fade Away won the 1997 Shamus Award and the Edgar Award for "Best Paperback Original", was nominated for the Anthony Award and the Barry Award in the same category, and was nominated for a Dilys Award. The following Myron Bolitar novel, Back Spin, won the 1998 Barry Award and was nominated for the Dilys Award and the Shamus Award. In 2002, Tell No One was nominated for the Anthony Award, the Macavity Award, the Edgar Award and the Barry Award. In 2010, Live Wire won the crime fiction award, the RBA Prize for Crime Writing, worth €125,000.

Films and TV series
Coben's first book to be adapted for the screen was Tell No One. Director Guillaume Canet made a French-language film based on the book, titled Ne le dis à personne (Tell No One), in 2006.

Coben's 2003 book No Second Chance became the basis for the 2015 French miniseries of the same name. Two years later the same happened to Just One Look.

Coben is the creator of the British crime drama television show The Five, which first aired in April 2016 on the Sky 1 channel in the United Kingdom. Coben also created the French-British crime drama television show Safe, which premiered on Netflix in 190 countries on 10 May 2018.

Amazon Studios will produce a series based on the first Mickey Bolitar novel Shelter.  Jaden Michael will star as Mickey, alongside Constance Zimmer, Adrian Greensmith, Abby Corrigan, and Sage Linder.

Deal with Netflix 
In August 2018, Coben signed a multi-million-dollar five-year deal with American company Netflix. Under the deal, 14 of Coben's novels would be developed into original Netflix series or films, with him serving as executive producer on all projects. The first title released under the deal was The Stranger, based on his novel of the same name, which premiered in January 2020. In October 2022, it was announced that Netflix had re-upped the deal for another four years, with the Myron Bolitar series now also available for adaptation. On February 20, 2023, Fool Me Once was announced as an upcoming adaptation in production for Netflix.

Personal life
Coben lives in Ridgewood, New Jersey, with his wife Anne Armstrong-Coben, a pediatrician, and their four children.

References

External links 

 
 

1962 births
Living people
American thriller writers
American mystery writers
American male novelists
Edgar Award winners
Livingston High School (New Jersey) alumni
People from Livingston, New Jersey
Writers from Newark, New Jersey
People from Ridgewood, New Jersey
Amherst College alumni
Jewish American novelists
Anthony Award winners
Shamus Award winners
Barry Award winners
20th-century American novelists
21st-century American novelists
20th-century American male writers
21st-century American male writers
Novelists from New Jersey
21st-century American Jews